New Zealand competed at the 2009 World Championships in Athletics that took place from 15–23 August. A team of 15 athletes was announced in preparation for the competition, but three were excluded for failing to meet qualifying standards, and Olympic 1500 metre medalist Nick Willis withdrew to recover from hip surgery. Selected athletes have achieved one of the competition's qualifying standards. The squad includes the defending world champion and Olympic champion in women's shot put Valerie Vili.

New Zealand's only medal came from Olympic and world champion Valerie Vili, who won the gold medal in the women's shot put.

Team selection

Track and road events

Field and combined events

Results

Men
Track and road events

Field events

Women
Track and road events

Field and combined events

References

External links
Official competition website

Nations at the 2009 World Championships in Athletics
World Championships in Athletics
New Zealand at the World Championships in Athletics